Coproptilia is a genus of moth in the family Lecithoceridae.

Species
 Coproptilia diona Wu, 1994
 Coproptilia glebicolorella Snellen, 1903
 Coproptilia tawiensis Park, 2009

References

Torodorinae
Moth genera